Lake Marmal is a locality in the local government area of the Shire of Buloke and Shire of Loddon, Victoria, Australia. The post office opened on 17 August 1878 and was closed on 28 February 1959.

References